Saint-Sulpice-de-Faleyrens (Languedocien: Sent Sulpici de Faleirens) is a commune in the Gironde department in Nouvelle-Aquitaine in southwestern France.

It is one of eight municipalities forming the jurisdiction of Saint-Emilion, which is  a UNESCO World Heritage of Humanity for its historic vineyard landscape that has survived intact and in use.

Geography

Population

Economy
The main activity of the town is related to viticulture.

Sights
 The Peyrefitte menhir is the largest menhir of Aquitaine. It was classified as a historical monument in 1889.

See also
 Communes of the Gironde department

References

External links 

 

Communes of Gironde